El Arado is a corregimiento in La Chorrera District, Panamá Oeste Province, Panama with a population of 2,715 as of 2010. Its population as of 1990 was 1,696; its population as of 2000 was 2,012.

References

Corregimientos of Panamá Oeste Province